Inocentes is one of the oldest active punk rock bands in Brazil. The group was formed in 1981 by former members of pioneer local punk bands Restos de Nada and Condutores de Cadáver.

During their first incarnation in the first half of the 1980s, Inocentes played basic energetic and politically charged hardcore punk, exemplified by the Grito Suburbano compilation tracks and their 7" EP "Miséria e Fome".

The original band split up in 1984, but frontman Clemente Nascimento put a new line up together a few months later with former members of São Paulo Oi! band Neuróticos. The new line up dropped the hardcore influences and adopted a cleaner, more melodic sound mixing punk, post-punk and other influences. In July 2016, their 1986 album Pânico em SP was elected by Rolling Stone Brasil as the 6th best Brazilian punk rock album.

Apart from some line up changes over the years, Inocentes are still active, always led by Nascimento, who has also been playing guitar for Brasilia post-punk veterans Plebe Rude since the mid-2000s.

Discography

References

External links
Official site

Musical groups established in 1981
Brazilian punk rock groups
Musical groups from São Paulo
1981 establishments in Brazil